Vázquez Island is an island lying between Fridtjof and Bob islands, off the southeast side of Wiencke Island in the Palmer Archipelago. It was first charted by the French Antarctic Expedition under J.B. Charcot, 1903–05. The name appears on an Argentine government chart of 1950.

See also 
 List of Antarctic and sub-Antarctic islands

References

Islands of the Palmer Archipelago